The following are the events in professional sumo during 1993.

Tournaments

Hatsu basho
Ryōgoku Kokugikan, Tokyo, 10 – 24 January

Haru basho
Osaka Prefectural Gymnasium, Osaka, 14 March – 28 March

Natsu basho
Ryōgoku Kokugikan, Tokyo,  9 May – 23 May

Nagoya basho 
Aichi Prefectural Gymnasium, Nagoya, 4 July – 18 July

Aki basho, Ryōgoku Kokugikan, Tokyo, 12 September – 26 September

Kyushu basho 
Fukuoka International Centre, Kyushu, 7 November – 21 November

News

January
24: Ōzeki Akebono takes his third top division championship and his second straight, virtually guaranteeing his promotion to yokozuna after only eight months as an ōzeki.  The second division jūryō championship goes to Aogiyama.  He would win a second eight years later in 2001. 
27: The Yokozuna Deliberation Council announces the promotion of Akebono to yokozuna, ending years of speculation about whether a foreign-born wrestler would ever be judged to have the dignity and ability necessary to wear the tsuna.  This also marks the end of the exceedingly rare occurrence of there being no active yokozuna, a gap which had lasted for eight months.

March
14: Akebono makes his yokozuna debut. Takahanada's ōzeki debut makes him the youngest ōzeki ever at 20 years and 5 months.
28: Following historical precedent, Akebono does not take the championship in his yokozuna debut, losing it to komusubi Wakahanada, who along with his first championship also snaps up the Technique Prize and the Outstanding Performance Prize.  His brother Takahanada is the runner up.  Tokitsunada takes his first of his two jūryō championships.

May
9: The brothers Ōzeki Takahanada and newly promoted sekiwake Wakahanada have their first tournaments at the new ring names Takanohana II and Wakanohana III respectively, to mark their pedigree as the sons of the legendary ōzeki Takanohana I and nephews of the great yokozuna Wakanohana II.
23: Takanohana takes his third top division yūshō, his first as an ōzeki, with a 14–1 record.  Akebono must settle for runner-up.  Future makuuchi regular Minatofuji takes the jūryō championship.

July
18: In Nagoya, Akebono finally gets his first championship as yokozuna by winning a three way playoff between himself and brothers Takanohana and Wakanohana.  It is Akebono's fourth championship.  Takanohana's loss would deny him a promotion to yokozuna this time around. Tatsuhikari wins his first of two jūryō championships.

September
12: Wakanohana debuts for the first time at ōzeki.  Future ōzeki Musōyama makes his makuuchi debut.  Ōzeki Konishiki is injured against Akinoshima and withdraws from the entire tournament after only this bout.
26: Akebono takes a consecutive championship and his fifth overall.  Takanohana is again runner-up.  Later makuuchi regular Hamanoshima has his one and only jūryō championship. Two former jūryō wrestlers announce their retirements –  Wakatosho at the age of 24 due to a left ankle injury, and Daigaku at age 28.

November
21: Akebono has his 3rd consecutive championship and his sixth overall by beating future yokozuna Musashimaru in a playoff.  Konishiki's 6–9 losing record following the previous tournament where he missed all but the first day, would see him finally lose ōzeki status after 39 consecutive tournaments. Asanowaka receives his one and only jūryō championship.

Deaths
3 September: Former komusubi Wakasegawa Taiji, also former Asakayama Oyakata, aged 73, of pancreatic cancer.

See also
Glossary of sumo terms
List of past sumo wrestlers
List of years in sumo
List of yokozuna

Sumo by year
Sumo